Sofia Costoulas (born 2 April 2005) is a Belgian tennis player.

Costoulas has a Greek–Congolese father and a Belgian mother.

Costoulas has a career-high singles ranking by the Women's Tennis Association (WTA) of 413 and a doubles ranking of 515, achieved on 12 December 2022.

On the ITF Junior Circuit, she had a career-high combined ranking of No. 2, achieved on 18 April 2022. She reached the final of the 2022 Australian Open girls' singles, where she lost to Petra Marčinko.

ITF Circuit finals

Singles: 4 (4 runner-ups)

Doubles: 2 (1 title, 1 runner-up)

Junior Grand Slam tournament finals

Girls' singles: 1 (runner-up)

Girls' doubles: 1 (runner-up)

Notes

References

External links
 
 

2005 births
Living people
Belgian female tennis players
Belgian people of Greek descent
Flemish sportspeople
21st-century Belgian women